Konstantin M. Vaysman is a Ukrainian banker. In October 2013 he was appointed chairman of the board of PJSC VTB Bank (Ukraine). Vaysman specializes in business strategy, finance, account management, controlling, strategic planning, marketing and mergers and acquisition.

Early life 
Vaysman was born 14 October 1969. He graduated from State University of Management, Moscow with a master's degree in Automated Control Systems. He first worked at Institute of Enterprise Management in Caen in 1991–1992. He earned an MBA in High Business School at the University of Chicago (London).

Career

Awards 
 Banker of the Year – 2011 awarded by ІІ International Contest "The Best Banks GUAM – 2011"

References

External links 
 About Konstantin Vaysman on сайте" Kommersant.ua.". 
 About Konstantin Vaysman on VTB Bank (Ukraine ". 

Living people
Ukrainian bankers
1969 births